Gim Ga-jin was an Imperial Korean politician, diplomat and an independence activist during Korea under Japanese rule.

Life 
Gim was born in 1846. His father was Gim Ung-gyun, who was a member of Andong Kim clan. His father was a Yejo Minister. He was a concubine child from a Kisaeng. He started his career as Chamseogwan of Royal library. In 1886, Kim passed Gwageo literary examination. On 16 May 1887 (Lunar Calendar), Gim was appointed as minister sent to Tokyo. He was sent back to Korea on 21 September 1891 (Lunar Calendar).

Gim was a great supporter of reform. Gim tried to eliminate Yeoheung Min clan from the power and bring Heungseon Daewongun to power. Daewongun also wanted to use Gim in the new government as a member of progressive fraction. Gim was appointed as Minister of agriculture, Industry and Commerce on 1 April 1895 (Lunar Calendar). Gim resigned his position on 17 August 1895 (Lunar Calendar). In August 1895, Gim was appointed as 1st Class member of Junchuwon. On 27 August 1895, Gim was appointed as the Korean envoy sent to Japan. Gim resigned from his office on 1 February 1896. He was appointed as 1st class member of the Junchuwon. In July 1896, Gim registered in the newly formed Independence Club.

In 1898, Gim was appointed as the observer of the Hwanghae Province,  in 1900 the speaker of the Jungchuwon and in 1902, he became special official of the Gungnaebu. After the Japan–Korea Treaty of 1905 was signed, Gim showed his disapproval. On 8 May 1906, Gim was demoted to the Observer of the South Chungcheong Province. He simultaneously served as the Judge of the South Chungcheong court from 16 May 1906. Gim became the president of Daehan Organizations and tried to vomit the Iljinhoe, a pro-Japanese organization of Korea. He retired from the officialdom.

After the annexation of Korea, Gim was ennobled as Baron. During the March 1st Movement, Gim participated as one of the representatives of Korea. After the March 1st Movement, Gim became the president of Daedongdan. On 19 October 1919, Gim fled to Shanghai with Yi Jong-uk, an agent from the Provisional Government of the Republic of Korea to Seoul. Gim and Yi went to Shanghai by train. Gim disguised himself as a man living in countryside. Gim's refuge was successful, helped the Daedongdan to act in Shanghai. After Daedongdan was dissolved, Gim joined the Provisional Government of the Republic of Korea. He died in Shanghai on 4 July 1922.

Honours 

 Order of the Palgwae 2nd Class on 11 April 1905

Sources 

1846 births

1923 deaths
Officials of the Korean Empire
Politicians of the Korean Empire
19th-century Korean people
Joseon politicians
Korean independence activists
Joseon Kazoku